The 2009 World Cyber Games (also known as WCG 09 or World Cyber Games 09) took place from November 11 to November 15, 2009, in Chengdu, Sichuan, China. It had over 600 participates from 70 countries taking part. The prize money is estimated at around $500,000.

Official Games 
Warcraft III, StarCraft, Counter Strike, FIFA 09, Carom3D, Red Stone and TrackMania Nations Forever on PC
Guitar Hero: World Tour and Virtua Fighter 5 on Xbox 360 
Asphalt4 and Wise Star 2 on Mobile

Competition Draw
The Competition Draws took place on October 19, October 20 and October 21. All competition draws took place on one of these three days.

 Oct. 19: Asphalt 4 > Wise Star 2 > Counter-Strike
 Oct. 20: Guitar Hero > Virtua Fighter 5 > FIFA 09
 Oct. 21: Carom 3D - > Trackmania Nations Forever - > StarCraft - > Warcraft III

Results

Official

Promotion

Sponsors
Samsung Electronics (Worldwide Partner)

Official theme song
The official theme song of the World Cyber Games is called "Beyond the Game" and the title is also the name of the World Cyber Games Motto.

Videos
The World Cyber Games published the different events on their YouTube account and their site.

References

External links
 2009 tournament group drawings

World Cyber Games events
2009 in Chinese sport
2009 in esports
Esports in China
Esports competitions in China
Sport in Chengdu